Akira Hayami (速水融）(1929–2019) was an emeritus professor of Keio University and the first to introduce historical demography in Japan. Professor Hayami is also famous for coining the concept called "Industrious Revolution",which points out the socio-economic change from capital-intensive to labor-intensive one.

Career 

1929: Born in Tokyo, Japan
1948: Entered The Faculty of Economics,  Keio University, Tokyo, Japan
1950: Graduated from Keio University
1968: Became the professor of Economics at Keio University
1994: Received Medal of Honor with Purple Ribbon from Japanese government
1995: Japan Academy Prize (academics)
1991: Emeritus Professor of Keio University
2000: Person of Cultural Merit
2001: Elected to be a member of Japan Academy
2008: elected to be a Honorary Member of French Academy of Sciences
2009: Received the Order of Culture from Japanese government
2019: Died on December 4

Industrious Revolution 
In the 1960s, Hayami generated a household micro-database called Basic Data Sheet (BDS), based on Tokugawa-period religious inquisition registration (宗門改帳). With the help of this database, he analyzed ca. 900 villages in the Nōbi region in central Japan and exploited the following fact. The number of livestock in these villages decreased gradually between the late 17th century and the 19th century, while the population and production increased or remained constant. Hayami also pointed out that people’s life expectancy improved during the same time span. These facts imply that the quantity of human labor input without livestock must have increased with aggregate output constant; he named this phenomenon “Industrious Revolution.” In this way, Hayami pioneered research to describe population dynamics before the Industrial Revolution with statistical methods in Japan.

References

External links 
 https://www.japan-acad.go.jp/en/index.html

1929 births
2019 deaths
Keio University alumni
Academic staff of Keio University
Members of the Japan Academy
Recipients of the Medal with Purple Ribbon
Recipients of the Order of the Rising Sun, 2nd class
Persons of Cultural Merit
Recipients of the Order of Culture